Boris Krimus (born January 20, 1969) is a Russian former footballer who played in the Soviet First League, Moldovan National Division, Liga Leumit, and the Canadian Professional Soccer League.

Playing career 
Krimus began his career in 1990 with FC Zimbru Chișinău in the Soviet First League. After the collapse of the Soviet Union he featured in the Moldovan National Division with CF Găgăuzia, and FC Tighina. In 1993, he went abroad to Israel to play in the Liga Leumit. During his time in Israel he played with Bnei Yehuda Tel Aviv F.C., Maccabi Ironi Ashdod F.C., Hapoel Beit She'an F.C., Hapoel Acre F.C., Maccabi Kafr Kanna F.C., and Hapoel Nazareth Illit F.C. In 2003, he went overseas to Canada to sign with North York Astros of the Canadian Professional Soccer League.

References

External links
 

1969 births
Living people
Russian Jews
Russian footballers
FC Zimbru Chișinău players
FC Tighina players
Bnei Yehuda Tel Aviv F.C. players
Maccabi Ironi Ashdod F.C. players
Hapoel Beit She'an F.C. players
Maccabi Acre F.C. players
Maccabi Kafr Kanna F.C. players
Hapoel Nof HaGalil F.C. players
North York Astros players
Moldovan Super Liga players
Liga Leumit players
Canadian Soccer League (1998–present) players
Association football midfielders